Charles Akwesi Agbeve (born 21 July 1970) is a Ghanaian politician and member of the Eighth Parliament of the Fourth Republic of Ghana representing the Agotime-Ziope Constituency in the Volta Region on the ticket of the National Democratic Congress.

Early life and education 
Charles Agbeve was born in Ziope Honugo in the Volta Region of Ghana. Charles Agbeve passed his Common Entrance Examination in 1982 which enabled him to obtain his Ordinary Level in 1987 and Advanced Level in 1989. He then proceeded to have his Bachelor of Science(Bsc) and Maths Diploma In Education in 1995 from University of Cape Coast. Charles Agbeve continued to have his Master of Business Administration – Finance Option (Health Insurance) in 2002 from University of Ghana, Legon – Ghana. Charles Agbeve also obtained his Master of Arts (Economic Policy Management) from 2017–2018.

Career 

Charles Agbeve served as a Maths and Science Teacher at Ghanatta Senior High School. Charles Agbeve has also worked as the Commercial Manager for Ghana Alumnium Products Limited. He also worked as the District /Municipal Manager of National Health Insurance Authority, Ho Municipal Office from 2009 to 2016. Charles Agbeve is now working as the Member of Parliament (MP) for Agotime-Ziope Constituency from 2021 to 2025.

Political Life 
In 2015, Charles Agbeve contested and won the NDC parliamentary primaries for Agotime-Ziope Constituency in the Volta Region of Ghana. Charles Agbeve also won the parliamentary seat in his constituency during the 2016 Ghanaian general elections on the ticket of the National Democratic Congress to join the Seventh (7th) Parliament of the Fourth Republic of Ghana. He won again with 19143 vote (87.80%)  in the 2020 Ghanaian general elections on the ticket of the National Democratic Congress to join the Eighth (8th) Parliament which is the current Parliament now until 2025.

Committees 
Charles Agbeve is a member of the Government Assurance Committee and Health Committee of the Eighth (8th) Parliament  of the Fourth Republic of Ghana.

Personal life 
Charles Agbeve is a Christian.

References 

1970 births
Living people
National Democratic Congress (Ghana) politicians
Ghanaian MPs 2013–2017
Ghanaian MPs 2017–2021
Ghanaian MPs 2021–2025